Vålådalen Nature Reserve is a nature reserve in Jämtland County in Sweden. It is part of the EU-wide Natura 2000-network.

The nature reserve contains a varied landscape with mountain tops, forests and wetlands. The area contains several geological peculiarities such as pyramidal hills, formed during the end-stages of the last Ice age. The fauna is rich, with species which are threatened in Sweden such as wolverine and Arctic fox represented. The flora also contains some unusual species (e.g. several types of orchids).

References

Nature reserves in Sweden
Natura 2000 in Sweden
Tourist attractions in Jämtland County
Geography of Jämtland County
Protected areas established in 1988
1988 establishments in Sweden